Ivan D'Oliveira (born 19 March 1941) is a South African former cricketer who played first-class cricket for Leicestershire. He is the brother of Basil D'Oliveira and the uncle of Damian D'Oliveira. Though he earned only one FC Cricket appearance in the English County Championship he was a heavy scorer in lower league South African cricket and played a number of games for Leicestershire's 2nd XI.

References
 Notes

 Sources
 Cricinfo article on Ivan D'Oliveira

1941 births
Living people
South African cricketers
Leicestershire cricketers
Cricketers from Cape Town
South African people of Portuguese descent